Vladimir Dmitriyevich Kalashnikov (born 17 December 1953) is a Russian professional football coach and a former player. Currently, he works as an assistant coach and a director with FC Ural Sverdlovsk Oblast.

External links
  Career profile at Footballfacts

1953 births
Living people
Soviet footballers
FC Ural Yekaterinburg players
Russian football managers
FC Ural Yekaterinburg managers
Russian Premier League managers
Association football forwards
Association football midfielders
FC Uralets Nizhny Tagil players